Liliana Ronchetti (15 September 1927 – 4 February 1974) was an Italian basketball player.

Background

On club level, Ronchetti played for Società Ginnastica Comense (1947–55, won the Italian League in 1950, 1951 (undefeated season), 1952 (undefeated season) and 1953, was the league's top scorer in 1952, 1953 and 1954), Bernocchi Legnano (1955–1956), Autonomi Torino (1956–57), Chlorodont Milano (1957–1958), Standa Milano (1958–65, was the league's top scorer in 1960), Zaiss Milano (1965–66), Ri.Ri Mendrisio (1966–71, won the Swiss League in 1967, 1968 and 1969) and Ignis Varese (1971–73). 

SRonchettihe scored 51 points in a game once while playing for Comense, that is the record high for an Italian women's league. She played 83 games for the Italy women's national basketball team, participating in Eurobasket Women in 1952, 1954, 1956, 1958, 1960 and 1962. 

After her sudden death only a year after Ronchetti retired, the  FIBA named the Ronchetti Cup in her honour. In 2007, she was enshrined in the FIBA Hall of Fame.

References

1927 births
1974 deaths
Deaths from cancer in Italy
FIBA Hall of Fame inductees
Italian women's basketball players
Place of death missing
Shooting guards
Sportspeople from Como